Mor is a nearly extinct Trans–New Guinea language of Indonesia. It is spoken along the Budidi River and the Bomberai River on the Bomberai Peninsula.

Classification
It may form a tentative independent branch of that family in the classification of Malcolm Ross (2005), but Palmer (2018) classifies it as a language isolate. However, the only connections are the 1sg and 2 ng pronouns na- and a-:

{|
! !!sg!!pl
|-
!1
|na-ya||ne-a
|-
!2
|a-ya||omase
|-
!3
|mena||morimene
|}

Usher classifies it with the other Trans–New Guinea languages of the Berau Gulf.

Nouns
Nominal inflection for number in Mor is limited to only certain animate nouns, such as mor ‘man’ and mor-ir ‘men’. Other nouns do not inflect for number, such as is ‘bird/birds’.

Vocabulary
The following basic vocabulary words are from Voorhoeve (1975), as cited in the Trans-New Guinea database:

{| class="wikitable sortable"
! gloss !! Mor
|-
| head || idura
|-
| hair || sa
|-
| eye || nana
|-
| tooth || nasona
|-
| leg || bana
|-
| louse || twoa
|-
| dog || afuna
|-
| pig || bia
|-
| bird || isa
|-
| egg || utreta
|-
| blood || wabmina
|-
| bone || weten
|-
| skin || gina
|-
| tree || wara
|-
| man || hiamia
|-
| sun || seba
|-
| water || sea
|-
| fire || taha
|-
| stone || puata
|-
| name || inagenena
|-
| eat || masmore
|-
| one || nadu
|-
| two || kin
|}

A word list of Mor has also been collected by Johannes Anceaux.

References

External links 
 Timothy Usher, New Guinea World, Mor

Berau Gulf languages
Languages of western New Guinea
Endangered Papuan languages